Tom D. Walshaw (1912–1998) was an engineer, author and contributor to the British magazines Model Engineer  and Engineering in Miniature. Many of his magazine contributions and books were authored under the pseudonym Tubal Cain. The pseudonym relates to the Tubal-cain, the biblical metal worker. As Tubal Cain he made over 424 contributions to Model Engineer, beginning in 1971. These were mainly divided between workshop equipment articles and model stationary engine constructional articles. He graduated in mechanical engineering at Loughborough University in 1934. and eventually, after a career in mechanical design, went back to that university in 1943, becoming, after some years, senior lecturer in mechanical engineering. He went on in 1948 to teach at University of Liverpool. In 1952 he was appointed Head of Department of Mechanical, Civil and Electrical Engineering at Darlington College of Technology. His final academic post was Head of Mechanical, Production and Civil Engineering at Lancashire Polytechnic. He gained the first of his many model engineering exhibition awards in 1949. At one point he was editor of the Transactions of the Newcomen Society. Walshaw died on 2 May 1998.

Model stationary steam engine designs
Among his most notable contributions to Model Engineer were constructional series detailing models of steam engines dating from the Industrial Revolution:
 A Vertical Columnar Engine. A model of the "Williamson" engine (serialised in 1976)
 Mary, a four-column beam engine (serialised in 1977)
Lady Stephanie, six-column tank-bed beam engine
 Georgina, a 19th-century overcrank engine (serialised in 1980–81)
 Boreas, a Crowther-type blast furnace blowing engine (serialised in 1983–84)
 Princess Royal & Goliath: variants on mid-19th century mill engines (serialised in 1984–86)
 Trevithick's Dredger Engine (serialised in 1987–88)

Books published
Walshaw published the following under his own name:
 Diesel engine design. London: George Newnes, 1949 (448 p). 2nd ed: 1953 (440 p).
 Ornamental Turning. Hemel Hempstead, UK: Argus Books, 1990 (208 p).
 The I.S.O. System of Units. Special Interest Model Books, Swanley, Kent, UK, 1991.

Walshaw published the following under the name 'Tubal Cain':
 Building the beam engine Mary. Watford, UK: Model & Allied Publications, Argus Books, 1981 (83 p).
 Building the Overcrank Engine "Georgina".
 Building the Williamson engine. Watford, UK: Argus Books, 1981 (85p).
 Model engineers handbook. Watford, UK: Model & Allied Publications, 1981 (170 p). 2nd ed: 1986. 3rd ed: 1996.
 Hardening, tempering and heat treatment. Workshop practice series no. 1. Hemel Hempstead UK: Argus Books, 1984, (124 p).
 Milling operations in the lathe. Workshop practice series no. 5. London: Argus Books, 1984 (125 p).
 Soldering and Brazing. Workshop practice series no. 9. Hemel Hempstead UK: Argus Books, 1985 (136 p).
 Drills, Taps and Dies. Workshop practice series no. 12. Swanley, England: Nexus Special Interests, 1987 (103 p).
 Workshop drawing. Workshop practice series no. 13. London: Argus Books, 1988 (110 p).
 Workholding in the lathe. Workshop practice series no. 15. London: Argus Books, 1987 (111 p).
 Simple workshop devices. Workshop practice series. Hemel Hempstead, UK: Argus Books, 1980 (127 p).
 Spring design and manufacture. Workshop practice series no. 19. Hemel Hempstead, UK: Argus Books, 1988 (95 p).
 Building simple model steam engines. Watford, UK, Model and Allied Publications, 1980 (107 p).
 Building simple model steam engines. Book 2. Hemel Hempstead, UK: Nexus Special Interests Ltd., 1998 (106 p).

References 

Model engineers
1912 births
1988 deaths
British mechanical engineers
Alumni of Loughborough University